Rina binti Mohd Harun (Jawi: رينا بنت محمد هارون) is a Malaysian politician who served as Minister of Women, Family and Community Development for the second term in the Barisan Nasional (BN) administration under former Prime Minister Ismail Sabri Yaakob from August 2021 to the collapse of the BN administration in November 2022 and the first term in the Perikatan Nasional (PN) administration under former Prime Minister Muhyiddin Yassin from March 2020 to August 2021, Minister of Rural Development in the Pakatan Harapan (PH) administration under former Prime Minister Mahathir Mohamad from May 2018 to the collapse of the PH administration in February 2020. She also served as the Member of Parliament (MP) for Titiwangsa from May 2018 to November 2022. She has also served as 1st Women Chief of the Malaysian United Indigenous Party (BERSATU), a component party of the PN coalition, since April 2017. Prior to joining BERSATU at its inception in 2016, she was a United Malays National Organisation (UMNO) member. She lost the Sepang seat in GE15 and currently no longer an MP

Early life
Rina was born on 18 April 1973 in Tanjung Karang, Selangor. She grew up in Jalan Gurney, Kampung Datuk Keramat, Kuala Lumpur and earned an early education at Sekolah Kebangsaan Datuk Keramat 1, Kuala Lumpur. She then continued her studies at Sekolah Tun Fatimah before continuing her studies at the MARA Institute of Technology (now Universiti Teknologi MARA) in Diploma in Banking Studies.

Early career 
Rina worked in commercial banking industry for eight years before she decided to focus on politics.

Early political career
UMNO
 Sepang Women's Youth UMNO Division Chief – 2002–2013
 Secretary of Selangor UMNO Women's Youth – 2002–2004
 Deputy Chief of Selangor UMNO Women's Youth – 2004–2006
 Selangor UMNO Deputy Women's Youth Chief – 2009
 EXCO of UMNO Women's Chief – 2009–2013
 UMNO Acting Women Chief of Bandar Baru Salak Tinggi – 2013–2016

PPBM
 Srikandi Chief

Pakatan Harapan
 Deputy Women Chief

Non-governmental organisations
 Assistant Treasurer, Selangor Youth Council
 Sepang District Youth Council Committee
Pro-chancellor, University of Kuala Lumpur

Ministerial career

Minister of Rural Development (2018 - 2020) 
After winning her first ever election at Titiwangsa in 2018 general election, Rina was appointed to Mahathir's cabinet as Minister of Rural Development by the new administration of Pakatan Harapan (PH).

Rina launched Harapan's Plan on Rural Development 2018–2023 in October 2018. The plan aims to make rural areas more conducive, inclusive, and sustainable. It concentrates on six key areas: infrastructure, economy, entrepreneurship, human capital, women, and delivery system. The strategy also aimed to prevent project overlap between the federal and state governments, emphasising the importance of both parties sitting down and working together to achieve holistic development. According to her ministry's records, the plan has benefited up to 500,000 rural communities as of April 2019.

Minister of Women, Family and Community Development (2020 - 2022)
During the Sheraton Move in early 2020, which saw the ousting of the elected Pakatan Harapan government, Rina gave Muhyiddin Yassin, the chairman of Bersatu, votes of confidence. Rina was elected as Minister of Women, Family and Community Development under Muhyiddin's cabinet.

Anti-Sexual Harassment Bill
In December 2021, the Anti-Sexual Harassment Bill 2021 was tabled by the deputy minister under her, PAS's Siti Zailah. "This bill, with a comprehensive definition of sexual harassment, will contribute towards creating a safe environment for the community, especially women", said Rina. Victims of sexual harassment will be protected through the enactment of the bill, which allows them to receive compensation of up to RM250,000 from the perpetrators. According to Rina, the new bill is not intended to replace the current justice system, but rather to improve it so that it will cover all areas, not just workplaces.

However, during the previous year, Rina Harun was criticised after informing the Dewan Rakyat that the tabling of the Sexual Harassment Bill was delayed partly due to the change in government with the new Perikatan Nasional administration taking over from Pakatan Harapan in March 2020. AWAM called for a set date for the bill to be tabled in the future and expressed Rina's failure on not focusing on the bill for the entire year when the draft was already presented, and in effect the ministry has lost the chance to ensure that a proper budget allocation was secured during the 2021 budget debate to ensure an effective implementation.

Controversies 
In her first month as Malaysia's women's affairs minister, Rina Harun caused controversy by posting two posters with sexist messages on the ministry's social media. One poster advised women not to nag their husbands if they did something that bothered them, but to use humour instead. Another poster emphasised the importance of a woman's appearance, even if she is working from home. Women's rights groups criticised the ministry for releasing these posters, urging them to focus on the increase of domestic abuse during Malaysian movement control order to contain Covid-19 spread.

Rina attracted both ridicule and criticism after she held a photo shoot showcasing various outfits at the official minister's office. Her weight loss prompted speculation of gastrectomy surgery. 

Netizens criticized her for “glamming up” in the middle of an economic downturn, while her ministry seems to have little achievement since the beginning of the pandemic and movement control order (MCO) last year. Former CEO of the National Welfare Foundation (Malay: Yayasan Kebajikan Negara, YKN) Che Asmah Ibrahim released a public post on Facebook claiming that Rina's use of official space to model 2021 Hari Raya fashion during the pandemic was highly inappropriate.

In February 2021, Rina Harun came under scrutiny after she paid off an RM1.3mil debt to avoid bankruptcy, with opposition politicians demanding explanations on how she managed to pay such a large sum based on her salary as Women, Family and Community Development Minister. Through her now defunct company - Eurofine (M) Sdn Bhd, Fine Mobile Network Sdn Bhd and Fine TV Network Sdn Bhd – she had purchased several comedy shows and documentaries worth millions of ringgit from Sarl Novovision, a Paris-based production company between 2011 and 2013. She was earlier served with a bankruptcy notice for debts amounting to RM1,340,642.02. There were questions on how she had accumulated sufficient wealth and funds to pay off the huge debt in a short period of 15 months as the asset declaration data with Malaysian Anti-Corruption Commission showed that her assets stood at RM72,000 when the same was made public on Nov 20,2019, with an income of RM34,004.48 a month.

Personal life
In January 2021, Rina was tested positive for COVID-19. Both she and her mother had recovered after treatment.

Election results

Honours

Honours of Malaysia
  :
  Grand Commander of the Exalted Order of Malacca (DGSM) – Datuk Seri (2018)

External links

References 

2. ^ "Federal Government Gazette – Notice of Polling Districts and Polling Centres for the Federal Constituencies and State Constituencies of the States of Malaya [P.U. (B) 197/2016]" (PDF). Attorney General's Chambers of Malaysia. 29 April 2016. Retrieved 2016-07-08.

1973 births
Living people
People from Selangor
Malaysian people of Malay descent
Malaysian Muslims
Malaysian United Indigenous Party politicians
Former United Malays National Organisation politicians
Members of the Dewan Rakyat
Government ministers of Malaysia
Women government ministers of Malaysia
Women members of the Dewan Rakyat
Northwood University alumni
21st-century Malaysian politicians
21st-century Malaysian women politicians